Parliamentary elections were held in Serbia on 21 September 1903. Following the elections, Sava Grujić of the People's Radical Party formed a government in coalition with several independents.

Results

References

Serbia
Parliamentary 2
1903 09
Serbia